According to the Hebrew Bible, Midian ( Mīḏəyān) is the fourth son of Abraham and Keturah, the woman Abraham married after Sarah's death. His brothers are Zimran, Jokshan, Midian, Ishbak and Shuah. His sons are Ephah, Epher, Enoch, Abida, and Eldaah.

Josephus records that "Abraham contrived to settle them in colonies; and they took possession of Troglodytis and the country of Arabia the Happy, as far as it reaches to the Red Sea."  

Midian is generally considered ancestral to the Midianite people found in later portions of the Hebrew scriptures.

In Islam
Some Muslim genealogists claim he was the son of Lot's daughter.

References

Book of Genesis people
Children of Abraham
Midian